Thomas Grenville  (31 December 1755 – 17 December 1846) was a British politician and bibliophile.

Background and education
Grenville was the second son of Prime Minister George Grenville and Elizabeth Wyndham, daughter of Sir William Wyndham, 3rd Baronet. George Nugent-Temple-Grenville, 1st Marquess of Buckingham, was his elder brother and William Grenville, 1st Baron Grenville, his younger brother. He was educated at Eton.

Career
In 1778, he was commissioned ensign in the Coldstream Guards and in 1779 promoted a lieutenant in the 80th Regiment of Foot, but resigned his commission in 1780. He was, with one interval, a member of parliament from 1780 to 1810, and for a few months during 1806 and 1807 President of the Board of Control (1806) and then First Lord of the Admiralty (1806–1807). In 1798, he was sworn of the Privy Council.

On 1 February 1799 Grenville and a party were travelling on  when she was wrecked near Scharhörn off the Elbe. She was trying to deliver Grenville and his party to Cuxhaven, from where they were to proceed on a diplomatic mission to meet Frederick William III of Prussia in Berlin during the War of the Second Coalition. Proserpine was stuck in ice in worsening weather. At 1:30, on 2 February, all 187 persons on Proserpine left her and started the six-mile walk to the island Neuwerk, in freezing weather and falling snow. Seven seamen, a boy, four Royal Marines, and one woman and her child died; the rest made it to safety in the tower of Neuwerk. The diplomatic party reached Cuxhaven on 6 February to continue to Berlin via Hamburg and return to London on 23 March.

Library

He began collecting books from at least his early twenties, and by his death had amassed 20,240 volumes containing 16,000 titles. The collection is notable for its many editions of Homer, Aesop and Ariosto, for early travel books, and for literature in the Romance languages. Rare volumes include a vellum copy of the Gutenberg Bible, which Grenville bought in France in 1817 for 6,260 francs, a Mainz Psalter and a Shakespeare First Folio. There are also 59 manuscripts. Grenville liked his books to be in excellent condition, and would often have books washed or rebound, as well as seeking out relevant pages to add to any incomplete copies he owned. He lent books widely, Barry Taylor describing his library as apparently "semi-public".  He bequeathed the collection to the British Museum, of which he had become a trustee in 1830, and it is now housed in the King's Library Tower in the British Library.

Personal life

Grenville died at Piccadilly, London, in December 1846, aged 90. He never married.

Citations

References

 British Historical Facts 1760–1830, by Chris Cook and John Stevenson (The Macmillan Press 1980)

Further reading
Payne, J.T., Foss, H. and Rye, W.B. Bibliotheca Grenvilliana. London, 1842–72. Catalogue of Thomas Grenville's library. Copies held by many major scholarly libraries.

External links 
 
Biography
British Library's description of the Grenville Library
The Grenville Library copy of the Gutenberg Bible. Select the 'vellum copy' option to see images of the Grenville Library copy.

|-

1755 births
1846 deaths
British MPs 1774–1780
British MPs 1780–1784
British MPs 1790–1796
British MPs 1796–1800
Children of prime ministers of the United Kingdom
Coldstream Guards officers
Lords of the Admiralty
Members of the Parliament of Great Britain for English constituencies
Members of the Privy Council of Great Britain
Members of the Parliament of the United Kingdom for English constituencies
People educated at Eton College
South Staffordshire Regiment officers
UK MPs 1801–1802
UK MPs 1802–1806
UK MPs 1806–1807
UK MPs 1807–1812
UK MPs 1812–1818
Thomas
Ambassadors of Great Britain to France
Shipwreck survivors
Presidents of the Board of Control